Anaphosia mirabilis is a moth of the subfamily Arctiinae. It was described by Max Bartel in 1903. It is found in Kenya and Malawi.

References

Moths described in 1903
Lithosiini
Moths of Africa